The Saskatchewan Human Rights Commission is a body within the Government of Saskatchewan whose mission is "To promote and protect the individual dignity, fundamental freedoms and equal rights of Saskatchewan citizens." It enforces the Saskatchewan Human Rights Code.

See also 
Canadian Human Rights Tribunal
Canadian Human Rights Commission
British Columbia Human Rights Tribunal
 Ontario Human Rights Commission

References

External links
 Saskatchewan Human Rights Commission website

Government of Saskatchewan